The Resurrection River is a large river on the Kenai Peninsula in Alaska. It rises near Upper Russian Lake in the Kenai Mountains and flows  to empty into Resurrection Bay near Seward. Part of the river passes through Kenai Fjords National Park. There has been small-scale placer mining for gold at the confluence of the river and Placer Creek.

Fishing
Fishing for salmon is permitted in the lower Resurrection River. The river and bay it drains into have a very productive silver salmon fishery which peaks in August.
Other notable fisheries in the river include minor runs of Chinook salmon and Sockeye salmon.

References

Rivers of Kenai Peninsula Borough, Alaska
Rivers of Alaska